Fathers and Sons (Otcy i deti, ; pre-1918 spelling Отцы и дѣти), literally Fathers and Children, is an 1862 novel by Ivan Turgenev, published in Moscow by Grachev & Co. It is one of the most acclaimed Russian novels of the 19th century.

Plot
Arkady Kirsanov has just graduated from the University of Petersburg. He returns with a friend, Bazarov, to his father's modest estate in an outlying province of Russia. His father, Nikolay, gladly receives the two young men at his estate, called Marino, but Nikolay's brother, Pavel, soon becomes upset by the strange new philosophy called "nihilism" which the young men, especially Bazarov, advocate.

Nikolay, initially delighted to have his son return home, slowly begins to feel uneasy. A certain awkwardness develops in his regard toward his son, as Arkady's radical views, much influenced by Bazarov, make Nikolay’s own beliefs feel dated. Nikolay has always tried to stay as current as possible, by doing things such as visiting his son at school so the two can stay as close as they can, but this in Nikolay's eyes has failed. To complicate this, the father has taken a servant, Fenechka, into his house to live with him and has already had a son by her, named Mitya. Arkady, however, is not troubled by the relationship; on the contrary, he is delighted by the addition of a younger brother.

The two young men stay over at Marino for some weeks, then decide to visit a relative of Arkady's in a neighboring province. There, they observe the local gentry and meet Madame Anna Sergevna Odintsova, an elegant woman of independent means, who cuts a seductively different figure from the pretentious and conventional types of the local provincial society. Both are attracted to her, and she, intrigued by Bazarov's singular manner, invites them to spend a few days at her estate, Nikolskoye. While Bazarov at first feels nothing for Anna, Arkady falls head over heels in love with her. 

At Nikolskoye, they also meet Katya, Anna Sergevna's sister. Although they stay for just a short time, Arkady begins to find himself and become more independent of  Bazarov's influence. Bazarov, in particular, finds falling in love distressing because it runs counter to his nihilist beliefs. Eventually, prompted by Odintsova's own cautious expressions of attraction to him, he announces that he loves her. She does not respond overtly to his declaration, though she is drawn to Bazarov; she finds his devaluation of feelings and of the aesthetic side of existence unattractive. Anna cannot open herself to him because she does not see the possibility of a good future with him. After his avowal of love, and her failure to make a similar declaration, Bazarov proceeds to his parents' home, and Arkady decides to accompany him.

At Bazarov's home, they are received enthusiastically by his parents, and the traditional mores of both father and mother, who adulate their son, are portrayed with a nostalgic, idealistic description of humble people and their fast disappearing world of simple values and virtues. Bazarov's social cynicism, invariably on display with outsiders, is still on display as he settles back into his own family's ambience. He interrupts his father as the latter speaks to Arkady, still claiming the center of attention. Arkady, who has delighted Bazarov's father by assuring him that his son has a brilliant future in store, reproves his friend for his brusqueness. Later, Bazarov almost comes to blows with Arkady after the latter makes a joke about fighting over Bazarov's cynicism. Arkady becomes more openly skeptical of Bazarov's ideals. After a brief stay, much to the parents' disappointment, they decide to return to Marino, stopping on the way to see Madame Odintsova, who receives them coolly. They leave almost immediately and return to Arkady's home.

Arkady remains for only a few days and makes an excuse to leave in order to go to Nikolskoye again. Once there, he realizes he is not in love with Odintsova, but instead with her sister Katya. Bazarov stays at Marino to do some scientific research, and tension between him and Pavel increases. Bazarov enjoys talking with Fenechka and playing with her child, and one day he kisses her, against her will. Pavel observes this kiss and, secretly in love with Fenechka himself and in protection of both Fenechka and Nikolay's feelings for her, challenges Bazarov to a duel. Pavel is wounded in the leg, and Bazarov must leave Marino. He stops for an hour or so at Madame Odintsova's, then continues on to his parents' home. Meanwhile, Arkady and Katya have fallen in love and have become engaged. Anna Sergevna Odinstova is hesitant to accept Arkady's request to marry her sister, but Bazarov convinces her to allow the marriage. 

While back at home, Bazarov ceases to pursue his experiments, turning to help his father's work as a country doctor. He cannot keep his mind on his work, though, and while performing an autopsy fails to take proper precautions. He cuts himself and contracts blood poisoning. On his deathbed, he sends for Madame Odintsova, who arrives just in time to hear Bazarov tell her how beautiful she is. She kisses him on the forehead and leaves; Bazarov dies from his illness the following day.

Arkady marries Katya and assumes the management of his father's estate. His father marries Fenechka and is delighted to have Arkady home with him. Pavel leaves the country and lives the rest of his life as a "noble" in Dresden, Germany.

Major characters
In order of appearance

Chapter 1

 Nikoláy Petróvich Kirsánov – A gentleman in his early forties, a widower, "quite grey now, stoutish and a trifle bent," a liberal democrat, father of Arkády, brother of Pavel; should have followed his father's career in the army but broke his leg on the day he was commissioned and had to go into the civil service; owns Maryino, "a respectable little property of his consisting of a couple of hundred serfs—or five thousand acres." He is thrilled to have his son back from college. 

Chapter 2
 Arkády Nikoláyevich Kirsánov – Son of Nikoláy Petróvich; having recently graduated from St. Petersburg University, he brings his friend of Bazarov home to Maryino. He has become a nihilist more from Bazarov's influence than from conviction. He becomes enamored of Anna Sergeyevna Odinisov, but cannot compete for her affections with his fascinating friend Bazarov. Later he falls in love with Anna Sergeyevna's quiet, modest young sister Katya and marries her. 
 Yevgény Vasílevich Bazárov – A medical student and nihilist, in which role he serves as a mentor to Arkady, and as a challenger to the liberal ideas of the Kirsanov brothers and the traditional Russian Orthodox feelings of his own parents. "A long thin face with a broad forehead...large greenish eyes and drooping, sandy whiskers — the whole animated by a tranquil smile betokening self-assurance and intelligence." He eventually dies of pyaemia carelessly contracted during a medical examination, accepting his fate with calm resignation. 

Chapter 4

 Prokofyich – a servant of the Kirsánovs's; "A man of about sixty ... white-haired, lean and dark-complexioned."
 Pável Petróvich Kirsánov – Nikoláy Petróvich’s brother; "...of medium height ... looked about forty-five ... close-cropped grey hair ... his face the colour of old ivory but without a wrinkle ... unusually regular and clean-cut features ... perfumed mustaches." A bourgeois with aristocratic pretensions ("an exquisite pink hand having long tapering pink nails"), he prides himself on his refinement but, like his brother, is reform-minded. Although he recognizes Bazarov as the son of a local doctor, he detests him "with every fiber of his being," thinking him "an arrogant, impudent fellow, a cynic and a vulgarian."

 "Fenéchka" (Feodósya Nikoláyevna) – "...a young woman of about three and twenty with a soft white skin, dark hair and eyes, red childishly-pouting lips and small delicate hands." Daughter of the late housekeeper at Maryino with whom Nikoláy Petróvich has fallen in love and fathered a son, named Mitya; Arkady welcomes having a little half-brother. The implied obstacles to marriage are difference in class, and perhaps Nikoláy Petróvich's previous marriage — the burden of 'traditionalist' values.

Chapter 12
 Matvei Ilyich Kolyazin – A cousin of the Kirsanov brothers who serves as the inspector of the provincial governor in a nearby town. He is pompous and self-important but "he was always being made a fool of, and any moderately experienced official could twist him round his finger."
 Víktor Sítnikov – A pompous and foolhardy friend of Bazarov who joins populist ideals and groups. Like Arkady, he is heavily influenced by Bazarov in his ideals. "I appreciate the comforts of life...but that doesn't prevent me from being a liberal." 

Chapter 13
 Avdótya (Yevdoksíya) Nikitíshna Kúkshina – An emancipated woman who lives in the town where Matvei Ilyich is posted. Kukshina is independent but rather eccentric and incapable as a proto-feminist, despite her potential.

Chapter 14
 Ánna Sergéyevna Odíntsova – A wealthy widow, 29 years old, who entertains the nihilist friends at her estate; "...rather a strange person. Having no prejudices of any kind, and no strong convictions even, she was not put off by obstacles and she had no goal in life...Arkady decided he had never yet met such a fascinating woman. The sound of her voice haunted his ears...her every movement was wonderfully flowing and natural." However, the young Arkady does not fascinate her the way the worldly Bazarov does. They experience a rift, but she hurries to his bedside upon hearing that he's dying. 

Chapter 16

 Yekaterína (Kátya) Sergéyevna Lókteva – The younger sister of Anna: "...a girl of eighteen with black hair, an olive complexion, a rather round but pleasing face and small dark eyes." She lives comfortably with her sister but lacks confidence, finding it hard to escape Anna Sergeevna's shadow. This shyness makes her and Arkady’s love slow to realize itself.
 The Princess – Ánna Sergéyevna's aunt, "...a small shriveled woman with a clenched fist of a face and glaring spiteful eyes under a grey wig..." Rude and overbearing but essentially ignored by the household. 

Chapter 20
 Vasíly Ivánovich Bazárov – Bazarov’s father. A retired army surgeon, and a small countryside land/serf holder. Educated and enlightened, he nonetheless feels, like many of the characters, that rural isolation has left him out of touch with modern ideas. He thus retains loyalty to traditionalist ways, manifested particularly in devotion to God and to his son Yevgeny. "'A comical old chap with a heart of gold'," in his son's words.
 Arína Vlásevna Bazárova – Bazarov’s mother. A very traditional woman of the 15th-century Moscovy style aristocracy and a pious follower of Orthodox Christianity, woven with folk tales and falsehoods. She loves her son deeply but is also terrified of him and his rejection of all beliefs.

Historical context and notes

The fathers and children of the novel refers to the growing divide between the two generations of Russians, and the character Yevgeny Bazarov, a nihilist who rejects the old order.

Turgenev wrote Fathers and Sons as a response to the growing cultural schism that he saw between liberals of the 1830s/1840s and the growing nihilist movement. Both the nihilists (the "sons") and the 1830s liberals (the "fathers") sought Western-based social change in Russia. Additionally, these two modes of thought were contrasted with the Slavophiles, who believed that Russia's path lay in its traditional spirituality.

Turgenev's novel was responsible for popularizing the use of the term nihilism, which became widely used after the novel was published.

Fathers and Sons might be regarded as the first wholly modern novel in Russian literature (Gogol's Dead Souls, another main contender, was referred to by the author as a poem or epic in prose as in the style of Dante's Divine Comedy, and was at any rate never completed). The novel introduces a dual character study, as seen with the gradual breakdown of Bazarov's and Arkady's nihilistic opposition to emotional display, especially in the case of Bazarov's love for Madame Odintsova.

The novel is also the first Russian work to gain prominence in the Western world, eventually gaining the approval of well established novelists Gustave Flaubert, Guy de Maupassant, and Henry James.

The Bolshevik revolutionary Vladimir Bazarov adopted his pseudonym from the character of Yevgeny Bazarov in this novel.

Adaptations
Canadian playwright George F. Walker's 1988 play Nothing Sacred is a stage adaptation of Fathers and Sons. Irish playwright Brian Friel has also adapted the novel, under the same title.

English translations
 Eugene Schuyler (1867) 
 Constance Garnett (1895, as Fathers and Children)
 Revised by Ralph E. Matlaw (1966, retitled Fathers and Sons)
 Revised by Elizabeth Cheresh Allen (1994, retitled Fathers and Sons)
 Isabel F. Hapgood (1903, as Fathers and Children)
 C. J. Hogarth (1921) 
 Richard Hare (1947, as Fathers and Children) 
 Harry Stevens (1950)
 Bernard Guilbert Guerney (1961)
 George Reavey (1961)
 Bernard Isaacs (1962)
 Avril Pyman (1962, as Fathers and Children)
 Rosemary Edmonds (1965)
 Barbara Makanowitzky 
 Richard Freeborn (1991)
 Michael R. Katz (1994, originally published as Fathers and Sons; retitled Fathers and Children in 2008)
 Peter Carson (2009)
 Michael Pursglove (2010, as Fathers and Children)
 Nicolas Pasternak Slater and Maya Slater (2022, as Fathers and Children)

References

External links

 
 Full text of Fathers and Sons 
 Full text of Fathers and Children in English at Project Gutenberg
 
 CliffsNotes on Fathers and Sons; includes plot summary, character analysis and various footnotes.
Critical Norton Edition of Fathers and Sons

1862 Russian novels
Works about nihilism
Novels by Ivan Turgenev
Novels set in 19th-century Russia
Russian philosophical novels
Russian political novels
Realist novels
Works originally published in The Russian Messenger
Russian novels adapted into films
Russian-language novels